The Crack is the debut album by English punk rock band The Ruts, released in 1979.

The album contains the UK hit singles "Babylon's Burning" (number seven on the UK chart in June 1979) and "Something That I Said" (number 29 in September 1979). The white-reggae "Jah War", which was written in the aftermath of the Southall unrest and the over-use of force by the Metropolitan Police Service's Special Patrol Group in 1979, was also released as a single but did not make the UK chart.

Artwork
The cover picture by artist John H. Howard shows the members of the group (from left to right: Malcolm Owen, Paul Fox, Dave Ruffy and Segs – who is perusing a copy of Exchange and Mart) seated on a large sofa, around them are some of their contemporaries such as Rat Scabies and Captain Sensible of The Damned (top right corner), Jimmy Pursey of Sham 69 (bottom right), while Peter Cook and Dudley Moore are standing behind Malcolm, John Peel appears to be doing something to a schoolgirl (in uniform) with a bar of chocolate on the left hand side, Jimi Hendrix looks on from the right, the wives and girlfriends of the band members appear in various poses, as does the band's roadie Mannah (seen from the back) who assisted in writing the song "S.U.S." which deals with the vagrancy act, widely used by London's Metropolitan Police Service in the late 1970s. The astronomer Patrick Moore looks on somewhat disapprovingly from the left.

The album sleeve contains a dedication to Jimmy O'Neal, one of the organizers of the Deeply Vale Free Festival, where the band had their beginnings.

The original painting is now in the possession of punk icon (and fan and friend of the Ruts), Henry Rollins, who had gone on a search for the painting with the band's blessing. Rollins proudly displayed the painting in a video promoting the 2019 remastered vinyl edition of The Crack.

Track listing

Personnel
The Ruts
 Malcolm Owen – vocals
 Paul Fox – guitar, backing vocals; occasional organ on "Jah War"
 John "Segs" Jennings – bass guitar, backing vocals; piano ("stanking Steinway") on "Jah War"
 Dave Ruffy – drums, percussion, backing vocals
with:
 Richard Mannah – backing vocals on "S.U.S" and "Criminal Mind"
 Bertie, Pocky, Rocky – backing vocals on "Jah War"
 Mick Glossop – synthesizer effects on "It Was Cold"
 Gary Barnacle – saxophone
 Luke Tunney – trumpet
Technical
 Mick Glossop – production, engineering, mixing
 The Ruts – cover concept
 John H. Howard – front cover painting

Charts

References

The Ruts albums
1979 debut albums
Virgin Records albums
Vagrancy
Albums produced by Bob Sargeant